Fresnes-Tilloloy (also: Fresne-Tilloloy) is a commune in the Somme département in the Hauts-de-France region of France.

Geography

Population

History
The name is derived from the French for the Linden (Limetree)(fr: tilleul) and the Ash(fr: frêne) and reference to the village (as Fresnum) is mentioned in 1207.
Tilloloy was also noted in 1373 as ThillolayThilloloy and Fresnes were joined as one commune sometime between 1790 and 1794 as the commune of Fresnes-Tilloloy.'

Traces of Gallo-Roman settlement have been found in the area, and the Roman road (the "chaussée de Brunehaut" is nearby

In 1346, Edward III, spent some time here

The commune was occupied from 17 February to 9 March 1871 by the Germans during the Franco-Prussian War.

Places of interest
 The Mairie which also houses the school.
 The medieval church, part demolished and rebuilt in 1860, is dedicated to Saint-Ouen.

 The cemetery

 The war memorial

See also
Communes of the Somme department

References

External links

 Historique des Régiments de 1914-18 

Communes of Somme (department)